Nilsen Peak is a prominent peak (780 m) at the north end of Waldron Spurs, marking the east side of the mouth of Shackleton Glacier. Named by Advisory Committee on Antarctic Names (US-ACAN) for W.B. Nilsen, Master of the USNS Chattahoochee during Operation Deep Freeze 1965.

Mountains of the Ross Dependency
Dufek Coast